Eric Ross Komitee (born December 21, 1970) is a United States district judge of the United States District Court for the Eastern District of New York.

Education

Komitee earned his Bachelor of Arts, with high honors, from Emory University, where he was inducted into Phi Beta Kappa, and his Juris Doctor, cum laude, from the New York University School of Law, where he served as the senior notes and comments editor of the New York University Law Review.

Legal career

After graduation from law school he served as a law clerk to Judge James Larry Edmondson of the United States Court of Appeals for the Eleventh Circuit. He has practiced as an associate in the Government Enforcement and White Collar Crime group of Skadden, Arps, Slate, Meagher & Flom and as an associate in the corporate practice group of Cravath Swaine & Moore. He previously served for eight years as an Assistant United States Attorney for the Eastern District of New York, rising to serve as Chief of the Business and Securities Fraud Section.

From 2008 to 2019, he served as General Counsel of Viking Global Investors in New York City.

Federal judicial service 

In August 2017, Komitee was one of several candidates pitched to New York senators Chuck Schumer and Kirsten Gillibrand by the White House as judicial candidates for vacancies on the federal courts in New York. On May 10, 2018, President Donald Trump announced his intent to nominate Komitee to serve as a United States district judge for the United States District Court for the Eastern District of New York. On May 15, 2018, his nomination was sent to the Senate. He was nominated to the seat that was vacated by Judge Eric N. Vitaliano, who assumed senior status on February 28, 2017. On August 1, 2018, a hearing on his nomination was held before the Senate Judiciary Committee. On September 13, 2018, his nomination was reported out of committee by a 21–0 vote.

On January 3, 2019, his nomination was returned to the President under Rule XXXI, Paragraph 6 of the United States Senate. On April 8, 2019, President Trump announced the renomination of Komitee to the district court. On May 21, 2019, his nomination was sent to the Senate. On June 20, 2019, his nomination was reported out of committee by a 21–1 vote. On December 2, 2019, the Senate invoked cloture on his nomination by a 81–5 vote. On December 3, 2019, his nomination was confirmed by a 86–4 vote. He received his judicial commission on December 5, 2019.

References

External links 

1970 births
Living people
20th-century American lawyers
21st-century American judges
21st-century American lawyers
Assistant United States Attorneys
Cravath, Swaine & Moore associates
Emory University alumni
Judges of the United States District Court for the Eastern District of New York
New York (state) lawyers
New York University School of Law alumni
People from Freeport, New York
Skadden, Arps, Slate, Meagher & Flom people
United States district court judges appointed by Donald Trump